"Anything Can Happen in the Next Half Hour..." (often shortened to "Anything Can Happen") is the second physical single, and third overall, by Enter Shikari and the second single to be released from their debut album Take to the Skies. It was released on 18 February 2007 for digital download and on 5 March 2007 on both CD and 7" vinyl. It is the band's highest charting single, charting at #27 in the UK single chart, and number 1 on the UK indie chart. There are two remixes of the song, Colon Open Bracket Remix and Grayedout Mix. Both are up for download on their official download store.

Track listing

 CD
 "Anything Can Happen in the Next Half Hour..." (Rou, Enter Shikari) - 4:40
 "Kickin' Back on the Surface of Your Cheek" (Rou, Enter Shikari) - 3:50
 "Keep It on Ice" (Rou) - 2:51

 7"

 "Anything Can Happen in the Next Half Hour..." (Rou, Enter Shikari) - 4:40
 "Kickin' Back on the Surface of Your Cheek" (Rou, Enter Shikari) - 3:50

Original version
In the original version of the song, a sample is heard from the introduction of the popular 1960s TV series Stingray in which the character says "Anything can happen in the next half hour". This is, however, not heard in the re-recorded version.

Chart performance

Personnel

Enter Shikari
Roughton "Rou" Reynolds - vocals, electronics
Liam "Rory" Clewlow - guitar
Chris Batten - bass, vocals
Rob Rolfe - drums
Production
Enter Shikari - production
John Mitchell - recording
Ben Humphreys - recording
Martin Giles - mastering
Keaton Henson - illustration, design

References

External links
 Video - "Anything Can Happen in the Next Half Hour..." video.
 Original Video - Original video using the 2004 EP version of the song.
 Stingray Introduction - The phrase can be heard at 0:44

2007 singles
Enter Shikari songs
Wikipedia requested audio of songs
2007 songs